Baywood is an unincorporated community located in East Baton Rouge Parish, Louisiana, United States, approximately  northeast of Baton Rouge.

Notes

External links
 Baywood, Louisiana from Hometown Locator

Unincorporated communities in Louisiana
Unincorporated communities in East Baton Rouge Parish, Louisiana
Baton Rouge metropolitan area